Riverside is a city in St. Clair County, Alabama, United States. It incorporated in 1886. At the 2010 census the population was 2,208, up from 1,564 in 2000.

Geography

The city is located along the Coosa River just east of Pell City along Interstate 20, which runs west to east through the southern part of the city. Access to the city can be found from exit 162. Via I-20, Birmingham is west 39 mi (63 km), and Atlanta is east 110 mi (177 km). U.S. Route 78 also runs through the city.

Demographics

2000 census
At the 2000 census there were 1,564 people, 663 households, and 464 families in the town. The racial makeup of the town was 85.10% White, 12.40% Black or African American, 0.83% Native American, 0.13% Asian, 0.51% from other races, and 1.02% from two or more races. 0.96% of the population were Hispanic or Latino of any race.
Of the 663 households 29.3% had children under the age of 18 living with them, 56.7% were married couples living together, 10.7% had a female householder with no husband present, and 29.9% were non-families. 25.9% of households were one person and 8.4% were one person aged 65 or older. The average household size was 2.36 and the average family size was 2.83.

The age distribution was 23.8% under the age of 18, 6.9% from 18 to 24, 30.1% from 25 to 44, 27.8% from 45 to 64, and 11.4% 65 or older. The median age was 38 years. For every 100 females, there were 94.8 males. For every 100 females age 18 and over, there were 89.6 males.

The median household income was $34,813 and the median family income  was $43,456. Males had a median income of $32,604 versus $21,920 for females. The per capita income for the town was $18,932. About 10.2% of families and 12.5% of the population were below the poverty line, including 18.0% of those under age 18 and 12.4% of those age 65 or over.

2010 census
At the 2010 census there were 2,208 people, 864 households, and 640 families in the town. The racial makeup of the town was 87.5% White, 10.6% Black or African American, 0.2% Native American, 0.7% Asian, 0.1% from other races, and .9% from two or more races. 1.1% of the population were Hispanic or Latino of any race.
Of the 864 households 30.6% had children under the age of 18 living with them, 61.0% were married couples living together, 9.3% had a female householder with no husband present, and 25.9% were non-families. 21.9% of households were one person and 7.2% were one person aged 65 or older. The average household size was 2.56 and the average family size was 2.99.

The age distribution was 24.2% under the age of 18, 6.8% from 18 to 24, 27.7% from 25 to 44, 30.2% from 45 to 64, and 11.1% 65 or older. The median age was 39.6 years. For every 100 females, there were 101.8 males. For every 100 females age 18 and over, there were 97.2 males.

The median household income was $59,250 and the median family income  was $65,057. Males had a median income of $52,300 versus $31,713 for females. The per capita income for the town was $27,452. About 6.4% of families and 9.0% of the population were below the poverty line, including 14.2% of those under age 18 and 6.0% of those age 65 or over.

2020 census

As of the 2020 United States census, there were 2,227 people, 1,051 households, and 780 families residing in the city.

References

Birmingham metropolitan area, Alabama
Towns in St. Clair County, Alabama
Towns in Alabama
1886 establishments in Alabama
Populated places established in 1886